Leesbrook Rugby Football Club is an Englishrugby union club based at the Asterdale Sports Centre in Spondon, Derby that plays in the Midlands Division.

2007-2008 Season

Club honors
Notts, Lincs & Derbyshire 4 champions: 1991–92
Notts, Lincs & Derbyshire 2 champions: 1993–94
Notts, Lincs & Derbyshire/Leicestershire 2 West champions: 2002–03 
Midlands 6 East (North-East) promotion playoff winners: 2007–08
 Pennant league champions 2016/17 , Derbyshire cup champions 2016/17

References

External links
   Leesbrook Rugby Club

Sport in Derby
English rugby union teams
Rugby union in Derbyshire